The 2013 Summit League women's basketball championship was held at the Sioux Falls Arena in Sioux Falls, South Dakota, from 9 March until 12 March.

Bracket

All Times Central
** – Denotes double overtime

Player honors
Most Outstanding Player - Nicole Seekamp (South Dakota)
All-Tournament Team - Gabby Boever, South Dakota State; Ashley Eide, South Dakota State; Kerah Nelson, IUPUI; Nicole Seekamp, South Dakota (MVP); Tempestt Wilson, South Dakota.

See also
2013 The Summit League men's basketball tournament

External links

The Summit League
Summit League women's basketball tournament